is a Japanese politician of the Democratic Party of Japan, a member of the House of Representatives in the Diet (national legislature). A native of Yōkaichi, Shiga and graduate of Nagoya University, he obtained his medical license in 1996 and received his Ph.D in medicine from Nagoya University. He was elected to the House of Representatives for the first time in 2003. He was defeated in the 2005 election. He ran again to the House of Representatives in 2009 in the 9th district of Aichi defeating Prime Minister from 1989 to 1991, Toshiki Kaifu in a stunning upset.

References

External links 
  in Japanese.

1971 births
Living people
People from Shiga Prefecture
20th-century Japanese physicians
Members of the House of Representatives from Aichi Prefecture
Democratic Party of Japan politicians
Nagoya University alumni
21st-century Japanese politicians